"They Remind Me Too Much of You" is a song written by Don Robertson and originally recorded by Elvis Presley for the 1963 MGM motion picture It Happened at the World's Fair.

In January 1963, the song was released (together with "One Broken Heart for Sale") as an advanced single from the movie. "One Broken Heart for Sale" reached number 11 on the Billboard Hot 100, and "They Remind Me Too Much of You" reached number 53.

Composition 
The song was written by Don Robertson. Musically, it is a ballad.

Recording 
Elvis Presley recorded the song for the MGM film It Happened at the World's Fair on September 22, 1962, at Radio Recorders in Hollywood. The recording sessions featured Scotty Moore, Tiny Timbrell and Billy Strange on guitar, Ray Siegel on bass, D.J. Fontana and Frank Carlson on drums, Don Robertson on piano, Dudley Brooks on organ, Clifford Scott on saxophone and clarinet. Additional vocals were provided by The Mello Men.

"One Broken Heart for Sale", coupled with "They Remind Me Too Much of You", was released as an advance single from the movie on January 29, 1963. The single was a relative failure — according to the Elvis Presley official website, it was "the first regularly scheduled Elvis single not to reach the Top 10" in the United States — which prompted RCA to scale back the packaging and retail price of the accompanying soundtrack album, whose sales would be only "little more than half of those for Girls! Girls! Girls!".

Track listing

Charts

References

External links 
 
 One Broken Heart for Sale / They Remind Me Too Much of You on the official Elvis Presley website

1963 songs
1963 singles
Elvis Presley songs
Songs written by Don Robertson (songwriter)